V. Ramaiah is an Indian politician former member of parliament and former Member of the Legislative Assembly of Tamil Nadu. He was elected to the Tamil Nadu legislative assembly as an Indian National Congress candidate from Tirumayam constituency in 1957 and 1962. He has been a minister in Kamaraj and Bhakthavachalam cabinet elections.

References 

Indian National Congress politicians from Tamil Nadu
Tamil Nadu ministers
Members of the Constituent Assembly of India
Possibly living people
Year of birth missing
Madras MLAs 1957–1962
Madras MLAs 1962–1967